Sasisena Temple or Nimunhi Temple (Temple with no entrance and exit) is found in Sonepur city of Subarnapur district, Odisha, India. The Sasisena Kavya written by Pratap Rai a well-known poet of 17th century describes the detail story behind this temple.,. The present Sasisena temple was built by Maharaja Vira Mitrodaya Singh (1902-1937 AD). However, it is reported that the Sasisena memorial was built before the second half of 18th century AD.

References

External links
Tourism in Sonepur

 
Hindu temples in Subarnapur district